Speed skating at the 1990 Winter Asian Games took place in Makomanai Skating Centre Sapporo in the city of Sapporo, Japan with nine events contested — five for men and four for women.

Schedule

Medalists

Men

Women

Medal table

Participating nations
A total of 58 athletes from 5 nations competed in speed skating at the 1990 Asian Winter Games:

References
 Results of the Second Winter Asian Games
 Results

 
1990 Asian Winter Games events
1990
Asian Games
Asian Games